Kevin Eastman (born April 7, 1955) is a former American basketball coach. He was assistant coach and Vice President for Basketball Operations of the Los Angeles Clippers of the NBA. Eastman joined the Clippers' coaching staff before the 2013–14 season.

Early life
Born in New Brunswick, New Jersey, Eastman grew up in Haddonfield, New Jersey and graduated from Haddonfield Memorial High School in 1973.

Playing career
Eastman then attended the University of Richmond and played on the Richmond Spiders men's basketball team from 1973 to 1977. Eastman was a two-time team captain and a three-year starter, and scored 1,162 points. He also a member of the university's athletic hall of fame. In early 1978, Eastman played professionally for the Richmond Virginians of the All-American Basketball Alliance (AABA). In 11 games, Eastman averaged 9.2 points.

Coaching career
Prior to joining the Clippers, Eastman served as the assistant coach to Doc Rivers for the Boston Celtics from the 2004–05 season until the 2012–13 season. He was the Nike Basketball's National Director of Skills in 2003–04, and spent 2002–03 as athletic director at Randolph–Macon College. Eastman spent five years (1994–1999) as head men's basketball coach at Washington State University and four years (1990–1994) as head coach at the UNC Wilmington.  In addition, he held assistant coaching positions at the University of Tulsa, Virginia Commonwealth University, Colorado State University and his alma mater, the University of Richmond.

Executive career
On June 16, 2014, the Clippers restructured the basketball operations. Eastman became vice-president for Basketball Operations. He announced his retirement from basketball on June 13, 2016.

Head coaching record

References

External links
 NBA profile (2010)
 Washington State profile (1999)

1955 births
Living people
American men's basketball coaches
American men's basketball players
Basketball coaches from New Jersey
Basketball players from New Jersey
Belmont Abbey Crusaders men's basketball coaches
Boston Celtics assistant coaches
College men's basketball head coaches in the United States
Colorado State Rams men's basketball coaches
Haddonfield Memorial High School alumni
Los Angeles Clippers assistant coaches
People from Haddonfield, New Jersey
Randolph–Macon Yellow Jackets athletic directors
Richmond Spiders men's basketball coaches
Richmond Spiders men's basketball players
Sportspeople from Camden County, New Jersey
Sportspeople from New Brunswick, New Jersey
Tulsa Golden Hurricane men's basketball coaches
UNC Wilmington Seahawks men's basketball coaches
VCU Rams men's basketball coaches
Washington State Cougars men's basketball coaches